Croydon is an unincorporated community in northeastern Morgan County, Utah, United States. It is part of the Ogden–Clearfield, Utah Metropolitan Statistical Area.

Description
Accessible from Interstate 84, it is home to Holcim's Devil's Slide Cement Plant and several hundred residents. Lost Creek runs through this small unincorporated town, just northeast of the Devil's Slide rock formation. Cattle and sheep ranches can be found throughout the valley and in the surrounding mountains. Croydon was also home to the annual Widowmaker, hosted by the Wilde family of Croydon Utah, the Widowmaker was a snowmobile and motorcycle hillclimbing event for several years.

Croydon was originally called Lost Creek, and under the latter name was founded in 1862. The present name is after Croydon, in England, the native land of a large share of the first settlers.

See also

References

External links
 

Unincorporated communities in Utah
Unincorporated communities in Morgan County, Utah
Ogden–Clearfield metropolitan area
Populated places established in 1862
1862 establishments in Utah Territory